The 2020–21 Munster Rugby season was Munster's twentieth season competing in the Pro14, alongside which they also competed in the European Rugby Champions Cup. It was Johann van Graan's fourth season as head coach.

Events
As in the 2019–20 Pro14 season, Munster spent the 2020–21 Pro14 season in Conference B, alongside Benetton, Cardiff Blues, Connacht, Edinburgh and Scarlets South African side the Southern Kings were scheduled to participate in the conference, but they declared their withdrawal from rugby for the remainder of 2020 due to financial difficulties and travel restrictions enforced by the South African government in response to the COVID-19 pandemic, before the South African Rugby Union board placed the club into voluntary liquidation in September 2020.

Due to the mid-season break during the 2019–20 season caused by the COVID-19 pandemic, the 2020–21 season started later than usual. The EPCR agreed a new format for the 2020–21 European Rugby Champions Cup in response to COVID-19: the top eight eligible teams from the Pro14, the Gallagher Premiership and Top 14 competed in a 24-team tournament divided into two pools of twelve teams, with each team playing four games in the pool stage - two at home and two away.

Ahead of the season, there were no changes to Munster's coaching stuff, though CEO Ian Flanagan told journalists that, while it isn't a priority, the search for a fifth coach to join the team remained active. Head of athletic performance Denis Logan returned home to the United States with his family at the end of October 2020, with Ged McNamara, previously the lead athletic development coach for Munster's academy, promoted to replace Logan. Elite player development manager Peter Malone left his academy role with the province in early 2021, and former Munster player Andi Kyriacou returned to the province as an elite player development officer in April 2021.

The big news in terms of player movements was the arrival of two of South Africa's 2019 Rugby World Cup-winning squad - centre Damian de Allende and lock RG Snyman. Irish-qualified fullback Matt Gallagher arrived from English club Saracens, while Hawaii-born prop Roman Salanoa made the move south from Leinster. Five academy players also graduated to the senior squad: prop Keynan Knox, hooker Diarmuid Barron, back-rower Jack O'Sullivan, centre Alex McHenry and winger Liam Coombes.

Two players - fly-half Tyler Bleyendaal and prop Brian Scott - were forced to retire from rugby due to injury during the 2019–20 mid-season break, whilst prop Ciaran Parker, locks Darren O'Shea and Seán O'Connor, back-rowers Arno Botha and Conor Oliver and centre Sammy Arnold departed the province for new clubs. Winger Alex Wootton also left the province on loan to Connacht for the 2020–21 season.

On the academy front, three players joined year one of the programme: hooker Scott Buckley, back-rower Alex Kendellen and fly-half Jack Crowley. Jack Stafford and Alan Tynan completed their three years in the academy and were released by the province. Lock Cian Hurley and winger Conor Phillips joined the academy in April 2021, whilst hooker Eoghan Clarke left to join English club Jersey Reds.

Munster opened their 2020–21 Pro14 season with a 30–27 away win against Scarlets on 3 October 2020. Despite nine penalties from Scarlets fullback Leigh Halfpenny and a red card for captain Peter O'Mahony, tries from Jack O'Donoghue and Chris Farrell kept Munster within touching distance of the hosts, and a try from replacement hooker Kevin O'Byrne, converted by Ben Healy, levelled the score going into the final minutes of the game, before academy fly-half Healy scored a 50-metre penalty in the 81st minute to earn what had previously looked like an unlikely win for the province.

The draw for the 2020–21 European Rugby Champions Cup was made on 28 October 2020, with Munster being drawn in pool B. The province faced English side Harlequins, where former Munster player and coach Jerry Flannery was a coach, and French side Clermont, who were, at the time, the only French side to have ever won a Champions Cup game in Thomond Park.

Munster's Champions Cup campaign commenced with a 21–7 home win against Harlequins on 13 December 2020, in which Gavin Coombes, Damian de Allende and Josh Wycherley made their tournament debuts. Coombes scored one try, with the other being a penalty try, with JJ Hanrahan and Ben Healy adding nine points of the kicking tee between them. Munster travelled away to Clermont for round two on 19 December 2020 and, despite trailing 28–9 to the home side at one point, fought back to earn a stunning 39–31 win at the Stade Marcel-Michelin. The tries for Munster came from Mike Haley, star-of-the-match CJ Stander and Kevin O'Byrne, with JJ Hanrahan scoring a perfect nine from nine off the kicking tee for the other 24 points.

It was announced in December 2020 that the 2020–21 Pro14 season would conclude after 16 rounds, with the winners of each conference advancing straight to the final on 27 March 2021. Four South African Super Rugby teams - the Bulls, Lions, Sharks and Stormers - were then be introduced in the Rainbow Cup.

In early January 2021, the EPCR took the decision to temporarily suspend rounds 3 and 4 of the 2020–21 Champions Cup, following a directive from authorities in France that French clubs should not participate in the scheduled matches in response to health risks posed by the COVID-19 pandemic.

Munster's 20–17 win against Connacht in round 14 of the 2020–21 Pro14 on 5 March 2021 saw them become the first team to qualify for 2021 Pro14 Grand Final, as the victory gave them an unassailable 12 point lead at the top of conference B with two rounds remaining. Munster were beaten 16–6 by arch-rivals Leinster in the 2021 Pro14 Grand Final on 27 March 2021.

The Champions Cup resumed on the weekend of 2/3/4 April 2021 with the top eight teams from each pool at the time of suspension progressing to the round of 16, where Munster had home advantage thanks to their wins in the opening games against Harlequins and Clermont. Munster were drawn against Toulouse.

In an enthralling encounter at Thomond Park, Munster led 16–9 at half-time thanks to two tries from Keith Earls and two penalties from Joey Carbery, but Toulouse pulled level thanks to a converted try from Matthis Lebel. Gavin Coombes scored from close-range to give Munster the lead again, before Toulouse captain Julien Marchand responded with a try to level the scores again at 23–23. Substitute fly-half JJ Hanrahan scored a penalty to give Munster a 26–23 lead heading into the final 15 minutes of the match, but Toulouse's talismanic scrum-half Antoine Dupont scored two tries in 9 minutes to help the French club pull away on the scoreboard. A late consolation try from Gavin Coombes, his second of the match, in overtime meant the final score was 40–33 to Toulouse, who became just the second French club to win a European match at Thomond Park and advanced to an away quarter-final against Munster's pool opponents Clermont.

Munster's Pro14 Rainbow Cup commenced with a 27–3 away win against Leinster on 24 April 2021, which was followed by a 38–10 home win against Ulster on 7 May 2021, before Munster's perfect start to the tournament was brought to a halt by a 24–20 home defeat against Connacht on 14 May 2021. The province returned to winning ways with a hard-fought 31–27 win against Cardiff Blues on 28 May 2021, however, Munster's hopes of reaching the final of the tournament were ended when northern pool leaders Benetton were awarded four match points after Covid-19 cases amongst their Welsh opponents Ospreys forced the cancellation of their scheduled fixture, giving the Italian team an unassailable lead at the top of the pool. Munster's final game of the tournament, and the season, was a 54–11 away win against Zebre on 11 June 2021.

Coaching and management staff

Players

Senior squad

Academy squad

Player movements
The 2020–21 season was unusual in that many of the players scheduled to join their new clubs during the summer pre-season ahead of the commencement of the new season were instead able to join during the mid-season break in the 2019–20 season caused by the COVID-19 pandemic. Below are the player movements originally scheduled for the 2020–21 season that instead took place in that mid-season break. Italics indicates players that transferred during the 2020–21 season.

Senior squad

Players in
 Keynan Knox promoted from Academy
 Liam Coombes promoted from Academy
 Alex McHenry promoted from Academy
 Jack O'Sullivan promoted from Academy
 Damian de Allende from  Panasonic Wild Knights
 Matt Gallagher from  Saracens
 RG Snyman from  Honda Heat
 Roman Salanoa from  Leinster
 Diarmuid Barron promoted from Academy
 Callum Reid from  Ulster (6-week loan)
 Ben Murphy from  Leinster sub-academy (7-week deal)
 Paddy Patterson from  Leinster academy (short-term deal)

Players out
 Arno Botha to  Bulls
 Sammy Arnold to  Connacht
 Conor Oliver to  Connacht
 Seán O'Connor to  Jersey Reds
 Ciaran Parker to  Jersey Reds
 Alex Wootton to  Connacht (season-long loan)
 Darren O'Shea to  Vannes
 Darren Sweetnam to  La Rochelle (three-month deal)

Academy squad

Players in
 Scott Buckley
 Jack Crowley
 Alex Kendellen
 Cian Hurley
 Conor Phillips

Players out
 Alan Tynan
 Jack Stafford to  Harlequins
 Eoghan Clarke to  Jersey Reds

2020–21 Pro14

Round 1

Round 2

Round 3

Round 4

Round 5

Fixture postponed due to COVID-19 cases amongst the Benetton squad.

Round 6

Round 7

Round 8

Round 9

Fixture postponed due to delayed COVID-19 test results from Leinster.

Round 10

Round 11

Rescheduled round 9

Rescheduled round 5

Round 12

Round 13

Round 14

Round 15

Round 16

Final

Rainbow Cup

Round 1

Round 2

Round 3

Round 4

Round 5
Round 5 was a bye-week for Munster.

Round 6

2020–21 European Rugby Champions Cup

Munster were drawn in pool B for the 2020–21 European Rugby Champions Cup. Due to the changed competition format for the 2020–21 season, Munster played home-and-away fixtures against French side Clermont, who were the only French team to have ever won a Champions Cup game at Thomond Park at the time, and English side Harlequins, where former Munster player and coach Jerry Flannery was a coach.

Pool B

Round 1

Round 2

Round 3

Round 4

Last 16

2020–21 Munster A season

Friendlies

Interpro Challenge Match

Annual Ireland U20 Challenge Match

References

External links
Official Munster website
Pro14 Munster
EPCR Munster

2020-21
2020–21 Pro14 by team
2020–21 in Irish rugby union
2020–21 European Rugby Champions Cup by team